The 2016 Spanish motorcycle Grand Prix was the fourth round of the 2016 Grand Prix motorcycle racing season. It was held at the Circuito de Jerez in Jerez de la Frontera on 24 April 2016.

Classification

MotoGP

Moto2

Moto3

Championship standings after the race (MotoGP)
Below are the standings for the top five riders and constructors after round four has concluded.

Riders' Championship standings

Constructors' Championship standings

 Note: Only the top five positions are included for both sets of standings.

References

Spain
Motorcycle Grand Prix
Spanish motorcycle Grand Prix
Spanish